The Precision 21 is an American trailerable sailboat that was designed by Jim Taylor as a cruiser and first built in 1986.

Production
The design was built by Precision Boat Works in Palmetto, Florida, United States from 1986 until 2018, but it is now out of production.

Design
The Precision 21 is a recreational keelboat, built predominantly of fiberglass, with wood trim. It has a fractional sloop rig, a raked stem, a plumb transom, a transom-hung rudder controlled by a tiller and a fixed stub keel with a retractable centerboard that has a NACA airfoil profile. It displaces  and carries  of ballast.

The boat is normally fitted with a small  outboard motor for docking and maneuvering.

The design has sleeping accommodation for four people, with a double "V"-berth in the bow cabin and two straight settee berths in the main cabin. The galley is located on the port side just aft of the bow cabin. The galley is equipped with a stove and a sink. The head is located in the bow cabin under the "V"-berth.

Operational history
In a 1987 review in Cruising World by Dan Spurr and Herb McCormick named the design the winner in the "tidy little trailerable category" and noted that the boat is "simple and straightforward, the boat should be a blast to sail and a comfortable place to enjoy the surroundings when the
day's trip is through."

In a 2010 review Steve Henkel wrote, "designer Jim Taylor ... draws a nice boat, and the Precision 21 is no exception. Furthermore, Precision Boatworks ... does a good job of molding and finishing these boats. Best features: With her big beam, 4' 4" headroom, and well-designed layout, she seems to have plenty of space below ... We think this makes her, more than her comp[etitor]s, what used to be called a 'wholesome' weekend boat for a family of two adults and one or two children. Her draft ... beats most of her comp[etitor]s by a wide margin when it comes to easy ramp launching. Workmanship on her hull, on the boats we've seen, is well above average. Worst features: At one time owners had trouble with the centerboard and leaking windows, but these problems were eventually recognized at the factory and as we understand it, the board and leak problems were corrected in succeeding production."

See also
List of sailing boat types

References

External links

Photo of a Precision 21

Keelboats
1980s sailboat type designs
Sailing yachts
Trailer sailers
Sailboat type designs by Jim Taylor Yacht Designs
Sailboat types built by Precision Boat Works